Ketti Gallian (25 December 1912 – December 1972) was a French actress.

Biography
Gallian was born  in Nice.  She went to Paris at the age of 15 and secured work as a model. She later went back to Nice and appeared in a number of foreign films made by Paramount.

Her performance in The Ace, in which she played opposite Raymond Massey on the London stage, resulted in a screen contract from Fox. However, she never became a success while acting in America and returned to France. She died, aged 59, in Paris.

Filmography

References

External links

 

1912 births
1972 deaths
French film actresses
People from Nice
20th-century French actresses